SS Rivière Sport, is a football (soccer) club from La Rivière, Réunion Island.

Squad

Rivière Sport